Daegu Catholic University ( DCU, previously named Catholic University of Daegu) is a private research university in Daegu, South Korea.  DCU is known for its academic strength, especially in the field of medical, pharmacy, health science, psychology, social science, and education.

One of the most prestigious universities in South Korea, students are mostly top 10% of their graduating class.

History

The St. Justin Seminary, from which the university claims descent, opened in Daegu on November 1, 1914, having been founded in May of that year.  The first four rectors of the school were French missionaries, the first being a Fr. Chargeboeuf, also known by his Korean name Song Duck-mang (송덕망).  The first Korean rector, Fr. Choi Min-sun (최민순), who took up the post in 1945, was also the last rector of the seminary, which closed due to the turbulent events of that year, sending most of its students home in May but remaining open until December to allow the final class of 4 to graduate.

In 1952, the Hyosung Women's Junior College (효성여자초급대학) was established, offering instruction to 150 students in the fields of music, literature, and home economics.  The following year, it became a four-year college, also offering instruction in pharmacology.  The college continued to expand steadily in the following years, establishing its graduate school in 1972 and gaining university status in 1980.

International relations
Daegu Catholic University maintains international relations with 290 universities & Colleges & Institutions in 39 countries:

The ASEAN International Mobility for Students (AIMS) programme member

 SEAMEO RIHED

IFCU member
International Federation of Catholic Universities

ASEACCU member
The Association of South East Asian Catholic Colleges and Universities

Australia 
Australian Catholic University

Canada 
The University of Alberta

China
China National Academy of Fine Art
China Sichuan Normal University
ChongQing University of Arts and Sciences
Guangdong University of Foreign Studies
Guizhou Normal University
Henan University of Traditional Chinese Medicine
Jilin University
Luoyang Normal University
Nanjing Normal University
Shandong Economic University
Shandong University
The Central University of Nationalities
Jiangxi Normal University
Yanbian University
Zibo Vocational Institute

France 
Université Catholique de Lille

Germany 
Martin-Luther-University Halle-Wittenberg

Hungary 
Ferenc Liszt Academy of Music

Indonesia 
Universitas Nasional
Atma Jaya Yogyakarta University
Atma Jaya Indonesia Catholic University, Jakarta
State University of Malang
Indonesia International Institute for Life Science

Italy 
Accademia di Belle Arti di Brera
Conservatorio di Musica S. Cecilia di Roma
Conservatorio Statale di Musica "Giuseppe Verdi"
Lorenzo de' Medici School
Pontificio Istituto di Musica Sacra
Universita Cattolica del Sacro Cuore
Universita per Stranieri di Perugia

Japan
Aichi Shukutoku University
Beppu University 
Dokkyo University
Elisabeth University of Music 
Saga University
Sophia University
University of Occupational Health Environmental Health

Mexico 
Universidad de Guadalajara

Mongolia 
Mongolian University of Science and Technology

Philippines 
Ateneo de Manila University
De La Salle University
San Beda University
University of Saint La Salle
University of San Agustin
University of Santo Tomas
University of Eastern Philippines

Russia 
Buryat State University
Donsky State Technical University
Peoples' Friendship University of Russia
Russian State University for the Humanities
Saint Petersburg State University
Krasnoyarsk State Pedagogical University named after V.P. Astafyev

Spain 
Universidad Pontificia de Salamanca

Taiwan 
Fu Jen Catholic University
Providence University

United Kingdom 
University College London

United States
Catholic Health Association of USA, Georgetown University	
Central Michigan University	
Doane College 	
Georgia Southern University	
Kettering University(GMI Institute)	
Minnesota State University, Mankato 	
Mississippi State University 	
Murray State University 	
North Dakota State University 	
The University of Alabama	
University of California, Merced	
University of Kansas	
University of North Carolina School of Medicine	
Western Michigan University

Uzbekistan 
Tashkent University

Vietnam 
The University of Dalat

Campuses 
Hyosung campus -[main]
St. Justin campus - [Theology]
St. Luke campus -[Medical school/Nursing school/DCU Hospital]

Organization and administration 
Governance
Endowment

Academics 
Teaching and Learning
Research
Global Rankings
The Center for World University Rankings (CWUR)
Scimago Institutions Rankings
US News Global University rankings

See also

Others 
List of colleges and universities in South Korea
Education in South Korea

External links
Official school website

Universities and colleges in North Gyeongsang Province
Catholic University of Daegu
Catholic universities and colleges in South Korea
Educational institutions established in 1914
1914 establishments in Korea